Miguel José Ferreira Andrade Cid (born 21 May 1992) is a Portuguese footballer who plays as a midfielder.

Football career
On 17 August 2014, Cid made his professional debut with Boavista in a 2014–15 Primeira Liga match against Braga.

References

External links

Stats and profile at LPFP 

1992 births
Footballers from Porto
Living people
Portuguese footballers
Association football midfielders
Boavista F.C. players
BFC Daugavpils players
Kemi City F.C. players
Gondomar S.C. players
Primeira Liga players
Campeonato de Portugal (league) players
Latvian Higher League players
Ykkönen players
Portuguese expatriate footballers
Expatriate footballers in Latvia
Expatriate footballers in Finland